Sidney and Ethel Grier House is a historic home located near Charlotte, Mecklenburg County, North Carolina.  It was built in 1916, and is one-story, three bay, vernacular Bungalow / American Craftsman style farmhouse. The house sits on a brick pier foundation, clapboard siding, and has a hipped roof with dormer. It has a -story recent rear addition. It features a wraparound recessed porch, supported by eight tapered half-posts on tall brick piers.

It was listed on the National Register of Historic Places in 2006.

References

Houses on the National Register of Historic Places in North Carolina
Houses completed in 1916
Houses in Charlotte, North Carolina
National Register of Historic Places in Mecklenburg County, North Carolina